The 2010 NCAA Division III men's lacrosse tournament was held from May 12 through May 30, 2010. It was the 31st annual Division III NCAA Men's Lacrosse Championship tournament. Sixteen NCAA Division III college men's lacrosse teams met after having played their way through a regular season, and for some, a play-in game to advance to the tournament.

The tournament culminated on Memorial Day weekend at M&T Bank Stadium in Baltimore, Maryland. That venue also hosted the Division I and Division II championships. The Division III championship game took place on May 30, as a doubleheader with the Division II final, and pitted perennial Division III powerhouse Salisbury against final newcomer Tufts University. It was Salisbury's eleventh championship game appearance under head coach Jim Berkman. Tufts controlled the game throughout on its way to upset Salisbury, 9–6. It was Tufts University's first NCAA championship in any sport.

Play-in games
The final four rounds of the tournament were preceded by six play-in games on May 12:
 Keene State 21 – Castleton State 7
 Middlebury 10 – Goucher 6
 Endicott 8 – Montclair State 6
 Springfield 7 – Widener 1
 Dickinson 7 – Ohio Wesleyan 3
 Roanoke 15 – Wittenberg 4
 Cabrini 10 – Denison 7

Tournament results

 *  = Overtime

References

NCAA Division III Men's Lacrosse Championship
Ncaa Division 3 Men's Lacrosse Championship
Ncaa Division 3 Men's Lacrosse Championship